Coyote Hills Regional Park is a regional park encompassing nearly 978 acres of land and administered by the East Bay Regional Park District. The park, which was dedicated to public use in 1967, is located in Fremont, California, USA, on the southeast shore of the San Francisco Bay. The Coyote Hills themselves are a small range of hills at the edge of the bay; though not reaching any great height, they afford tremendous views of the bay, three of the trans-bay bridges (Dumbarton Bridge, San Mateo Bridge, and the Bay Bridge), the cities of San Francisco and Oakland, the Peninsula Range of the Santa Cruz Mountains and Mount Tamalpais. In addition to the hills themselves, the park encloses a substantial area of wetlands.

There are a number of archaeological sites within the park, preserving evidence of habitation by Native Americans of the Ohlone group of tribes, including shellmounds. Access to these sites is not allowed for casual visitors, but they can be visited by arrangement.

There is a substantial network of hiking trails in the park, most of them also available to equestrians, and 3.5 miles (5.6 km) to cyclists. Most of the trails are wide fireroads that go around the hills and the marshes, and one fireroad that runs north-south through the hills ridge. There are few narrow trails which are off limits to bikers and equestrians. These trails connect to others in the east bay, and the San Francisco Bay Trail passes through the park. Cross country meets for local schools are held occasionally in the park. The waters to the south and west of the park form part of the San Francisco Bay National Wildlife Refuge, and a great deal of wildlife can be seen from the park trails.

History 
The East Bay area's original inhabitants were the Ohlone Native American people.  These native people were hunters and gatherers whose skills enabled them to live well off the land's natural bounty, where a large staple of their diet consisted of acorns.  A great number of Ohlone native descendants still live in the Newark/Fremont/Union City area.    At Coyote Hills Regional Park, much of this rich wetland is preserved, along with 2,000-year-old Tuibun Ohlone Indian shellmound sites.

Coyote Hills is home to the remnants of a large Project Nike missile base. It has intact facilities that are in disrepair and some still in place are used as radio transmission & microwave antenna stations. Guard stations are still visible throughout the park.

After the NIKE Missile Base was decommissioned, the Stanford Research Institute (SRI) occupied the base and area, and used the marshlands as facilities for Advanced Sonar Research, harboring many marine mammals, including dolphins. A firing range and aquifer exist on the southernmost hills. When SRI finished its mission in the mid-1960s, the site was dedicated for public use and turned over to EBRPD as manager in 1967.

Activities
Programs at the main shellmound site allow visitors to see a reconstructed tule house, shade shelter, pit house, and sweat lodge.

Hiking is the principal activity. Several named trails are involved in making a  loop around the park. A trail leads from the Visitor Center across the main road to a boardwalk that crosses the Main Marsh. At the end of the boardwalk, Muskrat Trail continues to the DUST (Demonstration Urban Stormwater Treatment) Trail, where the hiker can turn left onto Lizard Rock Trail, where he/she can see the chert outcroppings of the Coyote Hills, with the North Marsh visible on the right. Turn left onto the Bayview Trai, then go uphill on the Nike Trail, which crosses the saddle of the hills and leads to the paved portion of Bayview Trail. This follows the shoreline, affording a view of the salt marshes and birds feeding on the water. Turn left at Soaproot Trail to go back uphill, and left again at Quail Trail to return to the Visitor Center. 

The Alameda Creek Trail runs  from San Francisco Bay to the mouth of Niles Canyon. It forms the northern border of Coyote Hills park, and is really two trails in parallel: an equestrian trail on the northern levee and a bicycle trail on the southern levee.

Tours, open houses and school programs are offered at the Tuibun Ohlone Village site. The site includes an Ohlone-style family house, sweat house, and shade shelter. Reservations are required, and must be made in advance by calling  (510) 544-3220.

There two picnic areas, one at the Visitor Center, the other at the Quarry Staging Area. Both are non-reservable. Each has picnic tables, barbeque braziers, water, and shade. Hoot Hollow has a reservable group picnic area.

Group camping is available at the Dairy Glen campsite.  This 50-person group camp is available with reservations.  The site has picnic tables, a campfire ring, braziers, water, shade, and chemical toilets.

Facilities
The Visitor Center is open Wednesday through Sunday, 10 AM through 4 PM, and closed on Thanksgiving and Christmas Day. It has a store that sells brochures and gifts. The store also has a naturalist who can answer visitors' questions about the park. The center offers programs about the area, such as bird walking and native culture (e.g., making acorn soup). Clean restrooms and an outdoor picnic area are also at the center. A bird and butterfly nectar garden is adjacent to the Visitor Center.

Fees and other rules
The parking fee is $5.00 per vehicle ($4.00 per trailered vehicle. Bus fees are $25.00 each.
Dogs are welcome, but must be leashed and under control at all times. There is a $2.00 fee for each dog. Guide and service dogs are exempt from the fee.

References

External links 
Large collection of photos and trail descriptions of Coyote Hills
 
 Coyote Hills Trail Map

East Bay Regional Park District
Geography of Fremont, California
Parks in Alameda County, California
Parks in the San Francisco Bay Area
Tourist attractions in Fremont, California
San Francisco Bay Trail
Native American history of California